William Garraty (6 October 1878 –  6 May 1931) was a footballer in the early years of professional football in England, who played for Aston Villa from August 1897 to September 1908. Before playing for Villa he played for Aston Shakespeare. Garraty was capped once by England appearing in a game against Wales in 1903.

Career
Billy Garraty made his league debut for Aston Villa during the 1897–98 season but made just one other appearance that year and remained a bit part player as Aston Villa won the title the following year. Garraty became a first team regular in the 1899–1900 season as Aston Villa retained their title thanks to his league-leading 27 league goals – only Pongo Waring scored more in a single season.

Garraty made 41 appearances in the 1900–01 season, more than any other player. He went on to make 224 league appearances for the Villans, scoring 96 league goals, as well as helping his side to FA Cup success in 1905 with his Man of the Match display. During his time at Villa, Billy was regarded as one of the great utility players of the game despite his ability to score goals.

In 1906, Garraty lost his place in the Villa line up and made only a handful of appearances before signing for Leicester Fosse in 1908. Garraty failed to find the net in six appearances and the Foxes suffered relegation at the end of the season.

The remainder of Garraty's league career was spent in the second division with two years at West Bromwich Albion followed by his final season before retirement in 1910–11 with Lincoln City.

Family
Garraty is the great-great grandfather of footballer Jack Grealish, who played for and captained Aston Villa, currently he plays for Manchester City.

Honours
Aston Villa
 First Division: 1899–1900
 FA Cup: 1904–05
 Sheriff of London Charity Shield: 1901

References

External links

Aston Villa Player Database

English footballers
1878 births
1931 deaths
English Football League players
First Division/Premier League top scorers
Aston Villa F.C. players
England international footballers
West Bromwich Albion F.C. players
Lincoln City F.C. players
Leicester City F.C. players
Association football forwards
FA Cup Final players